Sir Alexander Wilson Hungerford (1884 – 19 January 1969), known as Wilson Hungerford, was a Unionist politician in Northern Ireland.

Born in Belfast, Hungerford was employed by the Irish Unionist Party from 1912.  In 1921, he became Secretary of the Ulster Unionist Council, serving until 1941, and was also Secretary of the Ulster Unionist Labour Association.  At the 1929 Northern Ireland general election, Hungerford was elected to represent Belfast Oldpark. He was also knighted in 1929.

Hungerford was appointed as an Assistant Whip in 1933, and given the title "Assistant Parliamentary Secretary to the Ministry of Finance".  In 1941, he moved to become Parliamentary Secretary to the Ministry of Commerce.  In 1943 he moved to the same post in the Ministry of Home Affairs, and in 1944 to Health and Local Government, before becoming Chief Whip in November, serving until the 1945 general election, when he lost his seat.

In 1948, Hungerford was elected to the Senate of Northern Ireland, serving until 1957, including a stint as Deputy Speaker from 1953 until 1956.

He retired to England and lived at Dragons, a prominent house in Upper Park, Loughton, Essex.

References

1884 births
1969 deaths
Northern Ireland junior government ministers (Parliament of Northern Ireland)
Ulster Unionist Party members of the House of Commons of Northern Ireland
Members of the House of Commons of Northern Ireland 1925–1929
Members of the House of Commons of Northern Ireland 1929–1933
Members of the House of Commons of Northern Ireland 1933–1938
Members of the House of Commons of Northern Ireland 1938–1945
Members of the Senate of Northern Ireland 1945–1949
Members of the Senate of Northern Ireland 1949–1953
Members of the Senate of Northern Ireland 1953–1957
Members of the House of Commons of Northern Ireland for Belfast constituencies
Ulster Unionist Party members of the Senate of Northern Ireland